Ramshisar is a village in the Sikar District of Rajasthan.

References

Villages in Sikar district